The Monocacy River Railroad Bridge and Viaduct is a  open deck steel girder bridge with two main spans crossing the river and two viaduct sections crossing the floodplain, south of Walkersville, Maryland. Originally constructed by the Frederick and Pennsylvania Line Railroad Company (F&PL). Construction began in late 1871, and continued until July 1872 when the railroad opened that year. It was rebuilt by the Pennsylvania Railroad prior first in 1900-1905 as an open deck riveted iron plate under girder bridge. In 1915, the bridge was surveyed as part of the Interstate Commerce Commission's ("ICC") effort to establish freight rates for the Parent railroad. In 1927, the Pennsylvania Railroad rebuilt the bridge again using deeper and thicker steel girders, but leaving the masonry piers intact. In 1972, the two 85 foot river spans were washed out by Hurricane Agnes. In 1982, the State of Maryland purchased the bridge as part of the railroad line. In 1995, the State rebuilt the river spans and Pier 3 which is located in the middle of the river crossing was completely reconstructed using concrete to replace the original masonry foundations.  In 2015, the State performed minor maintenance on the structure and painted some spans.  
As of 2016, the bridge is in active rail service, operated by the Walkersville Southern RR.

History

Construction

Bollman Iron Bridge
The original bridge was a "Bollman suspension truss". The Monocacy river bridge and viaduct structures were a mixture of wrought iron tension members and cast iron compression members, including other decorative elements, such as Doric styled vertical members and end towers, all cast iron and detailed. In 1872, Bollman's firm, Patapsco Bridge and Iron Works completed the bridge and viaducts with a total length of 326 feet.

Pennsylvania Railroad Rebuilds
The ICC survey work papers  indicate two rebuilds were performed on the Monocacy bridge after the 1872 construction but prior to the 1915 inspection:
The Bollman iron truss bridge of unknown span lengths for the Monocacy crossing was replaced by the Pennsylvania railroad in 1900 as part of a major rebuild of the bridge which included the abutments. 
In 1900, Pennsylvania replaced the river trusses with a steel under girder, open deck bridge of four spans. At that time, the abutment and pier masonry was augmented. Five years later in 1905, the Pennsylvania railroad replaced the remaining two spans that were erected by Bollman in 1872. 
Later in 1927, Pennsylvania rebuilt the entire bridge using steel plate girders of half-inch thickness and measuring 85 inches in depth.

No later rebuild by PRR was made after 1927 and prior to 1982 when the bridge was conveyed to the State of Maryland..

United States Railway Administration (USRA) Rebuild
No known USRA rebuild scope has been identified for this bridge.

State Railroad Administration (SRA 1995 - )
Subsequent to the conveyance of the railroad from Conrail to the State of Maryland in 1982, State Railroad Administration or (SRA,1978-92), developed a Maryland State Rail Plan. 
The SRA rebuilt the two 85 foot spans over the river that were damaged by Hurricane Agnes in 1972, as well as Pier 3 which was in the river in 1995.  Currently, the Department of Transportation, Maryland Transit Administration (MTA), (2001-) owns and maintains the bridge. In 2015, MTA performed additional maintenance on the spans and painted two of the four spans as well.

Notes

References

Bridges in Frederick County, Maryland
Bridges completed in 1872
Railroad bridges in Maryland
Viaducts in the United States
Steel bridges in the United States
Plate girder bridges in the United States